Sudha (Sanskrit : सुधा) is a Hindu/ Sanskrit Indian feminine given name meaning nectar.

Notable people named Sudha 
Sudha (actress), Telugu actress
Sudha Bhattacharya (born 1952), Indian academic, scientist and writer
Sudha Chandran (born 1964), Indian actress and dancer
Sudha Kheterpal, British-Indian musician
Sudha Malhotra (born  1936), Indian actress and singer
Sudha Murty (born 1950), Indian social worker and writer
Sudha Pennathur, Indian jewellery designer and entrepreneur
Sudha Rani (born 1973), Indian actress
Sudha Shah (born 1958), Indian cricketer
Sudha Shivpuri (1937–2015), Indian actress
Sudha Singh (born 1986), Indian athlete runner
Sudha Sundararaman (born 1958), Indian politician, activist and the central committee member of Communist Party of India
Sudha Varghese (born 1949), Indian social worker and Catholic nun
Sudha Yadav (born 1965), Indian politician and former member of the lower house of India's parliament Lok Sabha

See also
 Suda (surname)

References

Hindu given names
Indian feminine given names